The Wizard of Oz was a 1902 musical extravaganza based on the 1900 novel The Wonderful Wizard of Oz by L. Frank Baum.  Although Baum is the credited bookwriter, Glen MacDonough was hired on as jokewriter after Baum had finished the script.  Much of the original music was by Paul Tietjens and has been mostly forgotten, although it was still well-remembered and in discussion at MGM in 1939 when the classic film version of the story was made.  The show's history is covered in more than 100 pages of the book Oz Before the Rainbow; L Frank Baum's 'The Wonderful Wizard of Oz' on stage and screen to 1939 by Mark Evan Swartz.

The show premiered at the Chicago Grand Opera House on June 16, 1902 and then went on tour throughout the upper Midwest before moving to the Majestic Theatre on Broadway on January 21, 1903, where it ran for 293 performances through October 3.  A second company was established, and the show went on tour from September 1903 through March 1904  before returning to the Majestic with an updated "Edition De Luxe".  This version played through May and then moved on to the New York Theater for three weeks before returning to Chicago for a five-week run to finish the season.

The two companies toured the country from August 1904 to April 1905, and again from September 1905 to May 1906.  By this time, demand had slowed and the second company was disbanded on February 28, 1906. The main "Company A" had one final tour from August to November 1906 before the rights were sold to Hurtig and Seamon.  The new production resumed the tour through May 1907, and continued for the 1907–08 and 1908–09 seasons.  Finally, the show was released to stock theater companies in 1911.

Characters and Original Cast 
In order of appearance, the 1902 Chicago cast consisted of:  

There were several major character changes from the original book:
 Dorothy Gale's surname was introduced in the show. She had no name in the original book, but the surname is mentioned in Ozma of Oz (1907).
 Imogene the Cow replaces Dorothy's dog Toto.
 The Good Witch of the North causes a snowfall which defeats the spell of the poppies that had put Dorothy and the Cowardly Lion to sleep – this idea was later used in the classic 1939 movie.
 The role of the Cowardly Lion was reduced to a bit part, mostly to add humor.
 The Tin Woodman is called Niccolo Chopper. In the book he had no name, but would be called Nick Chopper in the sequels.
 The Wicked Witch of the West is mentioned but does not appear in this version.
 New characters in the piece are King Pastoria II and his girlfriend Trixie Tryfle (a waitress), Cynthia Cynch (a lady lunatic), Sir Dashemoff Daily (the poet laureate), Sir Wiley Gyle, and General Riskitt.

The main plot of the show, as recounted in newspapers of the time, is Pastoria's attempts to regain the throne from the Wizard of Oz. The original protagonists' search for the Wizard puts them on the wrong side of the law.

Plot
The main plot of the show, as recounted in newspapers of the time, is Pastoria's attempts to regain the throne from the Wizard of Oz. The original protagonists' search for the Wizard puts them on the wrong side of the law.

Act One: The Storm
A young girl named Dorothy Gale lives on the great Kansas prairie with her Aunt Em, Uncle Henry, and cow, Imogene.  One day, while she is playing with her pet cow, Imogene, a fierce whirlwind appears. Dorothy and Imogene take shelter in the farmhouse, which is carried far away into the clouds.

Meanwhile, in the hamlet of Center Munch, the little Munchkins dance around their maypole, not noticing that Dorothy's house has fallen to Earth and killed the Wicked Witch of the East. Dorothy opens the front door and marvels at the strange Land of Oz. The Good Witch of the North awards her with a magic ring that grants her three wishes and can summon Glinda the Good Witch of the South at any time. The Good Witch then waves her wand and a pair of silver shoes appear on Dorothy's feet. She tells Dorothy that if she wants to get home, she must ask the Wizard of Oz to help her.

After a while everyone exits, and Dorothy is left alone with a Scarecrow hung on a pole. She wishes she had someone to talk to, and he comes to life. He gets down from the pole and complains that he has no brain. Dorothy suggests that he join her on the road to the Emerald City, and he sings "Alas for the Man Without Brains." They come upon the Tin Woodman, who has rusted playing his piccolo. As it turns out, his real name is Niccolo Chopper. He explains that the Wicked Witch of the West took his heart, so he cannot love his girlfriend, Cynthia. He joins them in the hope of receiving a heart from the Wizard, so that he can return to Cynthia.

Act Two: The Emerald City
The Keeper of the Gates patrols outside the Emerald City. Sir Wiley Gyle enters, a mad old inventor who has scorned magic since his mother died. He is sent to prison for murdering his wife. The travelers enter the Emerald City.
 
The Wizard gives the Scarecrow a brain and the Tin Woodman a heart. He declares this the greatest of all his achievements and calls for a celebration. The Ball of All Nations is thrown, in which up to twelve songs are sung by various characters. The Wizard performs a basket trick in which King Pastoria is the mark. In the middle of it Pastoria claims his right to the throne and overthrows the Wizard. A great commotion breaks out, with the Wizard escaping in a hot air balloon. Dorothy, still longing to get home, sets off with her companions to the castle of Glinda, the Good Witch of the South.

Act Three: Glinda's Palace
Dorothy and her friends arrive at Glinda's palace and are welcomed. There are great celebrations, with Glinda promising to send Dorothy home. The whole cast rushes out from the wings and sings the finale.

Conception and script

L. Frank Baum decided to collaborate with his friend, composer Paul Tietjens, and The Wonderful Wizard of Oz illustrator W. W. Denslow as set and costume designer, to bring the book to the stage.  They completed a script, score and designs in 1901, hewing fairly close to the novel.  They submitted the package to the manager of the Chicago Grand Opera House, Fred R. Hamlin, who liked it and approached Julian Mitchell to be director.

Mitchell did not like the script, criticizing its lack of spectacle, calling it too subdued and small-scale. However, he sent a wire to Hamlin with the message "Can see possibilities for extravaganza".  When Mitchell accepted the project, he brought in new songwriters, cutting some of the original Tietjens numbers. He rewrote the script, together with Glen MacDonough, introducing new characters and incidents, reducing the Cowardly Lion's role, deleting the appearance of the Wicked Witch of the West entirely, and substituting a cow for Toto as Dorothy's companion. Baum was anxious about this, but went along. He hoped Mitchell's experience in directing, as well as the casting of comedy team Fred Stone and David C. Montgomery as the Scarecrow and Tin Woodman, would make the show a hit. It turned out to be a roaring success, with 293 performances.

Original Production
In rewriting Baum's 1901 script, Mitchell hired MacDonough to add topical humor. Baum described MacDonough as a New York joke writer in a letter to The Chicago Record-Herald, responding to criticism that the show "teemed with wild and woolly western puns and forced gags". In a letter to The Chicago Tribune published June 26, 1904, Baum decried rumors that he was "heartbroken and ashamed" with the final product of the musical: "I acknowledge that I was unwise enough to express myself as dissatisfied with the handling of my play on its first production ... few authors of successful books are ever fully satisfied with the dramatization of their work. They discern great gaps in the original story that are probably never noticed by playgoers." He admitted to protesting several innovations, but ultimately concluded: "The people will have what pleases them, and not what the author happens to favor, and I believe that one of the reasons why Julian Mitchell is regarded as a great producer is that he faithfully tries to serve the great mass of playgoers – and usually succeeds."

Most of the original songs were written by Paul Tietjens on Baum's lyrics, except for three: "The Guardian of the Gate" (although it was attributed to Tietjens), which was cut after only a few performances, "The Different Ways of Making Love" (wooing) and "It Happens Every Day" were composed by Nathaniel D. Mann. Mann later wrote the score for Baum's 1908 film/theatrical presentation, The Fairylogue and Radio-Plays. Most of Baum's songs related to the story in some way, as in operetta, but as performed, the play was more like vaudeville, and new songs by other songwriters were frequently substituted.  In fact, the first song interpolated into the musical was "The Traveler and the Pie", a major number for the Scarecrow. Baum and Tietjens had written it for a play called The Octopus; or the Title Trust, which was never produced and possibly never completed. The song stayed in the show. James O'Dea and Edward Hutchinson wrote one of the show's most celebrated songs, "Sammy", in which Tryxie Tryfle sings of a lost love before King Pastoria, though the only surviving recording of the piece was sung by a man (Harry Macdonough).

The witches are largely absent in this version; The Good Witch of the North appears, named Locasta, and The Wicked Witch of the East is a special effect. Toto, Dorothy's dog, was replaced by a cow named Imogene. The Wicked Witch of the West does not appear, but she is mentioned, and Glinda the Good Witch of the South, who had appeared only in Act Three, was written out by Mitchell in 1903. His re-write of that act was set in the Borderland that divides Oz and Glinda's Domain, as Dorothy and her friends try to escape Pastoria.

New characters include King Pastoria II, Oz's true king working as a Kansas motorman and his girlfriend, Trixie Tryfle, a waitress. There is also Cynthia Cynch, the Lady Lunatic, a prototype for Nimmie Amee, Nick (Niccolo) Chopper's girlfriend.  Niccolo Chopper is renowned for his ability on the piccolo, the subject of one of her songs, and he is shown playing a piccolo in The Wonderful Wizard of Oz, the first Oz film made without Baum's input, which was highly influenced by the popular play. The Wizard was presented as various ethnic stock character stereotypes, depending upon who played him. He was assisted by Sir Wiley Gyle and General Riskitt. David L. Greene and Dick Martin erroneously captioned a picture of General Riskitt as "Sir Wiley Gyle" in The Oz Scrapbook, and Donald Abbott carried this mistake over into his illustrations for How the Wizard Saved Oz.

The animals in the play, including the Cowardly Lion, did not speak, following the pantomime tradition. Although the lion costume was realistic, far more so than Bert Lahr's in the MGM film, his main purpose was a bit of comic relief and scaring off the villains on occasion. His quest for courage is completely omitted, much as the other characters' quests are deemphasized in favor of various comic routines. Ultimately, though, their desire to seek the Wizard's aid gets them caught on the wrong side of the revolution, jailed and ultimately scheduled for execution. In a deus ex machina, another tornado arrives to sweep Dorothy home from the chopping block.

Many new plot twists are virtually pointless. In addition to a kiss of protection, Dorothy gets three wishes, one of which is wasted on a triviality. The second is used to bring the Scarecrow to life, and the third is used so she can learn the song Sir Dashemoff Daily (a trouser role) has written to his girlfriend, Carrie Barry. This song was written by Baum and Tietjens, but some programs credited the song to Glen MacDonough and A. Baldwin Sloane to make their connection to the play look greater.

Probably the biggest influence on the 1939 MGM film, aside from making the story into a musical (but not using the score created for the stage version), is the field of poppies sequence that ended Act I. In the novel, Baum imaginatively has a legion of field mice pull a cart with the Cowardly Lion out of the poppy field. This was deemed unfeasible (though the stage version of The Wiz created a variation, with the mice as anthropomorphic vice cops), and Baum, though he included it in the 1901 script, replaced the scene with that of the Snow Queen creating a storm that destroys the poppies, much as Glinda does in the 1939 movie. This concluded Act I with an elaborate dance known as "Winter Jubilation", which James Patrick Doyle plays on synthesizers on the album, Before the Rainbow: The Original Music of Oz.

Because there were no cast albums in those days, theatre productions, including this production, often exceeded four hours in length because of multiple demands for encores, since many of the attendees knew they would never get to attend again. The most popular songs were often sung multiple times and this was often used to gauge whether a song should be retained or dropped. Two popular routines that were worked in include a sailing routine and a football routine, the latter parodying the level of violence in the sport, which had recently been lessened due to new regulations.

Preparing for Broadway - The 1902 Midwest Tour
After its successful summer run in Chicago, the show went on tour throughout the Midwest.  This not only gave the cast more experience and increased publicity, but also provided a chance to make some adjustments to the show before it headed to Broadway. There were only a few cast changes in August prior to the tour: Carlton King and Grace Kimball took over the roles of Pastoria and Tryxie Tryfle, and Bobby Gaylor became the Wizard of Oz.  Montgomery and Stone, who had been key to the success of the show as the Tin Woodman and Scarecrow, received five-year contracts.

Success on Broadway, 1903 to 1904
The Wizard of Oz opened at the Majestic Theatre on Broadway on January 21, 1903 and ran through October 3rd.  Due to its success, a touring company ("Company 2") was created and began its tour on September 7, 1903 at the Montauk Theater in Brooklyn, NY. Several of the Broadway stars were part of that opening show, while their touring counterparts performed as understudies in New York City.  They were joined on the tour circuit by the Broadway company ("Company A") on October 5, 1903.  Both companies toured through March 1904, when Company A returned to the Majestic for another engagement through the end of April, with a revised show billed as the "Edition De Luxe" that included many new musical numbers.

The show changed venues to the New York Theatre for a short run on May 2-21, 1904, and then returned to Chicago's Grand Opera House for a triumphant revival in its home city from May 23 - July 9, 1904. 

The major characters continued to be played by Fred Stone, David Montgomery, and Anna Laughlin, while new performers took over other roles over the years.

National Touring Companies, 1904 to 1906
Starting in August 1904 both the "A" and "2" companies were touring full time, although they did return to New York's Academy of Music at 14th and Irving Place for the Holiday season (November 7 - December 31). Company A tended to have week-long engagements in large cities, while Company 2 tended to have 1-3 day engagements in smaller cities and towns.  As interest in the show slowly began to wane, both companies took an extended summer break from April -September 1905.  By 1906, two companies were no longer required and Company 2 disbanded on February 28, 1906.  Montgomery and Stone announced that they were moving on to other work at the end of the season (May 1906).  Although Company A resumed touring in August, by November the Producer felt the show had run its course and put it up the rights for auction after the November 9, 1906 performance.  The highest bidder was Hurtig & Seamon.

Performers changed more frequently during this period, sometimes multiple times in a single season, as shown in the table below. In a few cases, the performers names are not yet identified.

The Final Years, 1906 to 1909
The Hurtig & Seamon show started its tour almost immediately, with the first show starting in New York City on December 9, 1906 at the Yorkville Theater. Although little information for this partial season is available, it seems that much of the cast would have been retained due to the limited preparation time (see table).  One exception was that the role of Dorothy was taken over by Minerva Coverdale.  The show continued to tour under the new management for another two seasons before finally closing for good in February, 1909.

The musical was released for stock and regional shows in 1911. It was revived as late as 1934, with Charles H. Pinkham in the role of the Scarecrow.

Reception
The critic of The New York Times described the show as "the Darling of Mr. Belasco's Gods". Leone Langdon-Key loved the scenery, but found Baum's script commonplace, commenting that many lines start with, "Well, wouldn't that..." and deplored Tietjens's "fondness for a lack of contrast and rhythms".

Grand Duke Boris Vladimirovich of Russia gained considerable notoriety by drinking champagne from the satin slipper of one of the chorus girls during a 1902 trip to Chicago.

Sequel
The success of the play led Baum to write The Marvelous Land of Oz after four years of demand for a sequel to the novel.  He dedicated the book to Montgomery and Stone, and made the roles of the Scarecrow and Tin Woodman prominent, with the roles of Dorothy and the Cowardly Lion reduced to a reminiscence.  After the team balked at leaving Wizard for a sequel, Baum wrote the stage musical, The Woggle-Bug, eliminating the Tin Woodman, replacing the Scarecrow with Regent Sir Richard Spud, replacing Glinda with Maetta from The Magical Monarch of Mo and renaming the Emerald City the "City of Jewels," though Oz is mentioned several times.  The first appearance of the title character was moved from halfway through the novel to the opening scene, and his mentor, Professor Knowitall, name shortened to Professor Knowitt, was raised to the level of romantic lead with a girlfriend named Prissy Pring, a Captain in General Jinjur's Army of Revolt.  Jack Pumpkinhead and The Woggle-Bug became a comic team analogous to the Scarecrow and Tin Woodman.  The play was performed at the Garrick Theater in Chicago and opened to reviews panning Baum's script and praising the score by Frederic Chapin.  No songs were interpolated (although two were derived from an earlier source and erroneously credited to Baum), but the general consensus was that the play was a cash-in or rip-off of The Wizard of Oz rather than a sequel.

Post-World War II revivals
The musical was performed in a concert version in New York City in May 1982 by the New Amsterdam Theatre Company. It was revived in Tarpon Springs, Florida by the New Century Opera Company in 1998 and 2006. Hungry Tiger Press published a two-CD set of vintage recordings related to the musical in 2003.

The Canton Comic Opera Company, a community theatre company in Canton, Ohio, performed a "restored" version in 2010.  They believe that their production was the first in over 80 years with full orchestra.

Music
The following table lists all musical numbers included over the years in the 1902 Wizard of Oz production. Most of this information is found (in a more descriptive, chronological format) in the book Oz before the Rainbow, by Mark Evan Swartz. This and other references are provided citations in the column header, and then simply named in the individual rows.  Some of the music was known even beyond the United States. During the Baums' 1907 stay at the Shepherd's Hotel in Cairo, Egypt, a Hungarian Gypsy Band played songs from the musical in their honor.

Much of what is known has come from surviving scripts and show programs which are not comprehensive, resulting in gaps. In particular, the musical numbers from 1906 - 1909 are not well documented. Additional information and citations from users is encouraged..

See also
The Wizard of Oz adaptations, other adaptations of The Wonderful Wizard of Oz

Notes

References
Swartz, Mark Evan.  Oz Before the Rainbow: L. Frank Baum's 'The Wonderful Wizard of Oz' on Stage and Screen to 1939. The Johns Hopkins University Press, 2000

External links
Complete book and lyrics at the New York Public Library
Cast and crew information
 Internet Broadway Database
Information on 2010 restoration and production

Musicals based on The Wizard of Oz
1902 musicals
Musicals based on novels
Works by L. Frank Baum